The FNAR is a semi-automatic designated marksman rifle first introduced to the shooting public in 2008. It is a product of the US-based subsidiary of Belgian company FN Herstal, the FN Manufacturing Co. Despite the name, the FNAR is not an "AR" type rifle. Rather, the FNAR rifle is based on the proven and quite popular Browning BAR hunting rifle (which is unrelated to the original Browning BAR M1918 rifle of World War II fame).

Overview

The FN FNAR is a gas-operated semi-automatic rifle. The short-stroke gas piston is located below the (internally chromed) barrel, within the stock. The barrel is locked using a rotary bolt with multiple lugs. The receiver is machined from aircraft-grade 7075 T6 aluminum alloy. The polymer stock has an adjustable buttstock and pistol grip. Ammunition is fed from a detachable box magazine, with a standard capacity of 20 rounds of 7.62 mm ammunition, although 5 and 10 round magazines are available if required by local legislation. There are no iron sights installed by default; each FNAR rifle is fitted with a Picatinny rail on the top of the receiver, and three more short rails are installed at the front of the rifle stock.

The FNAR uses a two-stage non-adjustable trigger specified at between 3.25 and 5.5 pounds.

Variants
The standard FN FNAR has a light fluted barrel. The heavy barreled FN FNAR-H variant weighs about a pound more. Both are out-of-the-box guaranteed to be capable of Minute of Angle accuracy. A Winchester-branded version is called the Winchester SX-AR. The standard model retains the pistol grip and comes with a heavy profile 20" match grade chrome lined barrel. Rails are a reduced length top rail for optics mounting and one short bottom rail section for sling or bi-pod mounting. It is finished in a Cerakote type Mossy Oak camo pattern. The standard 10 round SX-AR detachable box magazines are interchangeable with the 20 round FNAR magazines.

References

External links
 
 Owner's manual

Video
 FNH USA FNAR Video
 FNH USA FNAR 16" Video

7.62×51mm NATO semi-automatic rifles
Short stroke piston firearms
FNAR
Sniper rifles of Belgium